Olympico Club (short, just Olympico) is a social, recreational and sports club from Belo Horizonte, Brazil. The club was established in 1940, being the second recreational club in Belo Horizonte, after Minas Tênis Clube.  The club has long tradition in the formation of young athletes. Olympico's men's volleyball club plays in the Brazilian Men's Volleyball Superliga - B, the second-tier of Brazilian volleyball, being this the only professional team that the club maintains.

References 

Brazilian volleyball clubs
Sports clubs established in 1940
Volleyball clubs in Minas Gerais (state)
Sports teams in Belo Horizonte